= Plej =

Plej are an electronic DJ band from Gothenburg, Sweden. The two members are brothers Arvid and Erik Niklasson. They signed in 2002 to the music label Exceptional Records where they released their first album Electronic Music from the Swedish Leftcoast on 19 August 2003. The album was nominated for a Grammis in 2004.

They released their second album, Home is Where Your Heart Was, on 28 July 2008.
